Polwica may refer to the following places in Poland:
Polwica, Lower Silesian Voivodeship (south-west Poland)
Polwica, Greater Poland Voivodeship (west-central Poland)